Leslie Ernest Munns  (December 1, 1908 – February 28, 1997) was a pitcher in Major League Baseball. He pitched from 1934 to 1936 for the   Brooklyn Dodgers and St. Louis Cardinals. He played in the short-lived Twin Ports League in 1943.

Born in Fort Bragg, California, Munns died in Cedar Rapids, Iowa, on February 28, 1997, aged 88.

References

External links

1908 births
1997 deaths
Baseball players from California
Major League Baseball pitchers
Brooklyn Dodgers players
St. Louis Cardinals players
St. Paul Saints (AA) players
Montreal Royals players
Rochester Red Wings players
Houston Buffaloes players
People from Fort Bragg, California